Roseline Adebimpe Adewuyi is a Nigerian social educator, gender advocate and feminist. In 2020, she was among the sixty women profiled by BusinessDay Women’s Hub in celebration of Nigeria’s 60th independence and a 2018 fellow of Dalai Lama Fellowship due to her work on the development of the girl child.

Education
Adewuyi is from Ogbomosho, Oyo State. She graduated with first class in French earning a Bachelor of Arts degree from Obafemi Awolowo University and Masters in Art with Distinction from the University of Ibadan.

Career and activism
Adewuyi's mission is building a complete, self-reliant girl child and helping the girl to break all sort of gender stereotypes.

In 2018, Adewuyi started writing on her website each week highlighting issues around African girls and organizes regular school outreaches for girls in secondary schools, teaching them the skills they need as potential leaders. National Youth Service corps served as the bedrock of her activism as she received an Award as a distinguished corps member in Kwara State due to her community development contributions during her service year.

She has since been selected for fellowships and programmes in countries such as France, Rwanda, Ethiopia, Ghana, and the United States. Between 2019 and 2020, she was in the employ of the African Union, working as a French Translator and received recognitions including being a member of the Commonwealth Youth Gender Equality Network, ONE Champion, MCW fellow, the Dalai Lama Fellow, Award for Under 25 years of age Outstanding Social Innovator in Education by Ideation Hub Africa and represented Nigeria in France for the LabCitoyen Human Rights program sponsored by the French Embassy in Nigeria. To mark Nigeria's 60th Independence Day celebration, she was listed as one of “The 60 Women Doing Phenomenal Things” by the Business Day Women’s Hub.

Publications 
She has 10 publications

Selected publications 
 LA CONCEPTION DU MARIAGE AFRICAIN : UNE LECTURE DE RIWAN OU LE CHEMIN DE SABLE PAR KEN BUGUL., March 2022. Roseline Adewuyi 

 LANGUAGE, COMMUNICATION AND EDUCATION FOR AFRICA'S TRANSFORMATION. Joseph Akanbi ADEWUYI, Lydia Aduke Adewuyi, Roseline Adewuyi. March 2022

 LANGUAGE, LITERATURE, CULTURE, MIGRATION AND NATIONAL COHESION: EPIPHANY IN AMINATA SOWFALL'S DOUCEUR DE BERCAIL : A MECHANISM FOR THE TRANSFORMATION OF THE INDIVIDUAL AND THE COMMUNITY. Ahmed Titilade, Roseline Adewuyi,. Jan 2021

 PROBLEMS OF LEARNING FOREIGN LANGUAGES IN COLLEGES OF EDUCATION AND UNIVERSITIES IN NIGERIA: A COMPARATIVE STUDY OF ENGLISH AND FRENCH LANGUAGES. Joseph Akanbi, Anthony Oladayo Bernard, Roseline Adewuyi,. Sep 2015

References 

Living people
Date of birth missing (living people)
Year of birth missing (living people)
Nigerian feminists
Nigerian social entrepreneurs
Nigerian activists
People from Oyo State
Obafemi Awolowo University alumni
Nigerian women's rights activists
Nigerian Christians